The 1971 Harvard Crimson football team was an American football team that represented Harvard University during the 1971 NCAA University Division football season. Harvard finished fourth in the Ivy League.

In their first year under head coach Joe Restic, the Crimson compiled a 5–4 record and outscored opponents 180 to 167. David A. Ignacio was the team captain.

Harvard's 4–3 conference record placed fourth in the Ivy League standings. The Crimson outscored Ivy opponents 147 to 139. 

Harvard played its home games at Harvard Stadium in the Allston neighborhood of Boston, Massachusetts.

Schedule

References

Harvard
Harvard Crimson football seasons
Harvard Crimson football
Harvard Crimson football